Bertila Damas is a Cuban actress.

Career 
Damas began her career in Miami, where she worked in Spanish-language theater while in college. She was later accepted at the Circle in the Square Theater School in New York City. There, she met Terry Hayden, who got her interested in The Actors Studio, where she resided until Lee Strasberg's death. Afterward, she studied with Stella Adler.

Damas has worked on Broadway, off-Broadway, and the regional theater scene, including her Broadway debut playing Juliet in Romeo and Juliet for Joseph Papp on Broadway, directed by Estelle Parsons; Yerma in Yerma at the Arena Stage; Clemencia in Electricidad at the Mark Taper Forum; and Marta in Eduardo Machado's Fabiola at Theatre for the New City in NYC. She is a Garland Awards recipient.

Damas's films include Nothing but Trouble, Mi Vida Loca, and Fires Within. Her TV credits include The John Larroquette Show, King of the Hill, NYPD Blue, Star Trek: Deep Space Nine, Star Trek: Voyager, and Grimm.

On international Spanish television, Damas is known for her role as the villainous Marta on Angelica, mi vida for Telemundo. She has been seen and heard in dozens of commercials and voiceovers in both Spanish and English.

Damas has served on the SAG board of directors (2010–2012) and on the SAG-AFTRA board (2012–2015). Since 2010, she has been the SAG–AFTRA national chair of the Ethnic Employment Opportunities Committee.

Damas has a recurring role as Camila Santiago on NBC sitcom Brooklyn Nine-Nine.

Filmography

Film

Television

References

External links
 
 

Living people
American television actresses
American film actresses
Year of birth missing (living people)
21st-century American women